The Oxford Tobacco Research Station is a government agency conducting research on flue-cured tobacco and other crops. It is located in Oxford, North Carolina and has existed since 1911. Superintendents since 1911 have been Moss, Carr, Ayscue, Campbell, Clements, Priest and Smith. Much has been accomplished related to disease resistance and tobacco curing. Forestry, wildlife habitat and water quality studies were started during the 80's.

External links 
Oxford Tobacco Research Station  — North Carolina Department of Agriculture and Consumer Services
Guide to the Oxford Tobacco Research Station Records circa 1909-1984

Agricultural research stations
Agricultural research institutes in the United States
Government research
Tobacco in the United States
Tobacco researchers
1911 establishments in North Carolina
Research institutes in North Carolina